John Darley may refer to:

John Darley (bishop) (1799–1884), Irish Anglican bishop
John Darley (politician) (born 1937), Australian politician
John M. Darley (1938–2018), American social psychologist